Kim Jaggy (born 14 November 1982) is Swiss-born Haitian footballer who plays as a left-sided defender for FC Tuggen.

Club career 
Jaggy made his debut for Swiss league side Grasshopper in the 1999–2000 season and stayed with them for 10 seasons. In summer 2007 he signed a two-years contract with Dutch Eredivisie outfit Sparta Rotterdam.

In summer 2009 he was deemed surplus to requirements at Sparta and subsequently joined Greek side Skoda Xanthi.

After a two-year spell at the Greek club, Jaggy signed for FC Wil on 19 July 2011.

Honours
Swiss Championship
Winner (2): 2000–01, 2002–03

References

External links 
 Player profile – Sparta Rotterdam
 Sparta legt voor het eerst een Zwitser vast – Voetbal International 
 Voetbal International Profile
 

1982 births
Living people
Citizens of Haiti through descent
Haitian footballers
Haiti international footballers
Swiss men's footballers
Switzerland under-21 international footballers
Association football central defenders
Association football fullbacks
FC Aarau players
FC Wil players
Grasshopper Club Zürich players
Sparta Rotterdam players
Swiss Super League players
Eredivisie players
Swiss expatriate footballers
Haitian expatriate footballers
Expatriate footballers in the Netherlands
Swiss expatriate sportspeople in the Netherlands
Swiss people of Haitian descent
2013 CONCACAF Gold Cup players
2014 Caribbean Cup players
2015 CONCACAF Gold Cup players
Copa América Centenario players
FC Rapperswil-Jona players